Carol Townend is a writer of historical romances for Harlequin Mills & Boon. Her novels are generally set in Medieval England and Europe. Her first novel won the Romantic Novelists' Association New Writer's Award. She has also published a number of articles with Writing Magazine and Writers' News.

Biography
Born in 1953 in Harrogate, Yorkshire, England, Carol Townend was educated in Whitby by Anglican nuns. She read History at Royal Holloway College.   Her first novel, set in 11th century England and published by Mills & Boon, won the RNA New Writers' Award in 1989. Betrothed to the Barbarian, the final book in her Byzantine trilogy, was shortlisted for the 2013 RoNA Rose Award and Unveiling Lady Clare was shortlisted for the 2015 RoNA Rose Award. Carol lives in London with her husband and daughter.

Bibliography

Fiction by publication date
A Knight for the Runaway Nun (2023) Harlequin Mills & Boon
A Knight for the Defiant Lady (2023) Harlequin Mills & Boon
The Warrior's Princess Prize (2020) Harlequin Mills & Boon
The Princess's Secret Longing (2019) Harlequin Mills & Boon
The Knight's Forbidden Princess (2018) Harlequin Mills & Boon
 Mistaken for a Lady (2016) Harlequin Mills & Boon
 Lady Rowena's Ruin (2015) Harlequin Mills & Boon
 Lord Gawain's Forbidden Mistress (2015) Harlequin Mills & Boon
 Unveiling Lady Clare (2014) Harlequin Mills & Boon 
 Lady Isobel's Champion (2013) Harlequin Mills & Boon 
 Betrothed to the Barbarian (2012) Harlequin Mills & Boon
 Chained to the Barbarian  (2012) Harlequin Mills & Boon
 Bound to the Barbarian (2010) Harlequin Mills & Boon
 Her Banished Lord (2010) Harlequin Mills & Boon
 Runaway Lady, Conquering Lord (2009) Harlequin Mills & Boon
 His Captive Lady (2008) Harlequin Mills & Boon
 An Honorable Rogue (2008) Harlequin Mills & Boon
 The Novice Bride (2007) Harlequin Mills & Boon
 Blackthorn Winter (1993) Hodder Headline
 The Stone Rose (1992) Hodder Headline
 Leaves on the Wind (1990) Mills & Boon Masquerade
 Sapphire in the Snow (1989) (Winner of RNA New Writers' Award) Mills & Boon Masquerade
 Shattered Vows (1989) Mills & Boon Masquerade

Fiction by series
Convent Brides:
 A Knight for the Defiant Lady (2023) Harlequin Mills & Boon
 A Knight for the Runaway Nun (2023) Harlequin Mills & Boon

Princesses of the Alhambra:
 The Knight's Forbidden Princess (2018) Harlequin Mills & Boon
 The Princess's Secret Longing (2019) Harlequin Mills & Boon
 The Warrior's Princess Prize (2020) Harlequin Mills & Boon

The Knights of Champagne:
 Lady Isobel's Champion (2013) Harlequin Mills & Boon
 Unveiling Lady Clare (2013) Harlequin Mills & Boon
 Lord Gawain's Forbidden Mistress (2015) Harlequin Mills & Boon
 Lady Rowena's Ruin (2015) Harlequin Mills & Boon
 Mistaken for a Lady (2016) Harlequin Mills & Boon

Palace Brides:
 Bound to the Barbarian (2010) Harlequin Mills & Boon
 Chained to the Barbarian (2012) Harlequin Mills & Boon
 Betrothed to the Barbarian (2012) Harlequin Mills & Boon

Wessex Weddings:
 The Novice Bride (2007) Harlequin Mills & Boon
 An Honorable Rogue (2008) Harlequin Mills & Boon
 His Captive Lady (2008) Harlequin Mills & Boon
 Runaway Lady, Conquering Lord (2009) Harlequin Mills & Boon
 Her Banished Lord (2010) Harlequin Mills & Boon

The Herevi Sagas:
 The Stone Rose (1992) Hodder Headline
 Blackthorn Winter (1993) Hodder Headline

Stand Alone Novels:
 Shattered Vows (1989) Mills & Boon Masquerade
 Sapphire in the Snow (1989) Mills & Boon Masquerade
 Leaves on the Wind (1990) Mills & Boon Masquerade

Non-fiction
 Royal Russia (1995) Smith Gryphon, (reprinted by John Blake Publishing 2006)

References

External links
 Carol's Website
 Page on Fantastic Fiction

Living people
British romantic fiction writers
Writers of historical romances
1953 births